The Art of Shaving is a United States retail business of high-end men's shaving and skin care accessories. The first store was founded by Eric Malka and Myriam Zaoui in Manhattan in 1996.

The store was successful and opened a second shop on Madison Avenue. The brand developed a line of natural shaving products. The company grew to have stores in the United States, Canada, United Arab Emirates, Qatar, and Russia. Procter & Gamble purchased The Art of Shaving in 2009.
It was announced in January 2020 that parent company Procter & Gamble planned to close "most" stores due to a decline in mall traffic and changing consumer shopping habits  
The Art of Shaving currently operates 2 stores in the United States (New York and Florida) and 6 stores globally (outside of the US). 

The company entered a partnership with razor company Gillette with some The Art of Shaving franchises owned by Gillette.

References

External links 

Procter & Gamble brands
Personal care brands
Male grooming brands